Auratonota paidosocia is a species of moth of the family Tortricidae. It is found in Cuba.

The wingspan is about 14 mm. The ground colour of the forewings is golden olive, but silvery along the edges of the markings. These markings are brownish. The hindwings are pale brownish grey, with some creamy dots.

References

Moths described in 2000
Auratonota
Moths of the Caribbean
Endemic fauna of Cuba